Articles on the modern history of Spain:
Early Modern history of Spain
Habsburg Spain (16th to 17th centuries)
17th-century Spain
Bourbon Spain (18th century)
19th-century Spain
History of Spain (1814–73)
Restoration (Spain) (1874–1931)
20th-century Spain
Second Spanish Republic (1931–1939)
Francoist Spain (1936–1975)
History of Spain (1975–present)